The International Trade in Endangered Species Act 2008, is a Malaysian laws which enacted to implement the Convention on International Trade in Endangered Species of Wild Fauna and Flora and to provide for other matters connected therewith.

Preamble
WHEREAS the Convention on International Trade in Endangered Species of Wild Fauna and Flora was signed at Washington D.C. on 3 March 1973:
AND WHEREAS Malaysia deposited her instrument of accession on 20 October 1977 and therefore in accordance with Article XXII of the convention, the said Convention entered into force as far as Malaysia is concerned on 18 January 1978:

Structure
The International Trade in Endangered Species Act 2008, in its current form (14 February 2008), consists of 6 Parts containing 55 sections and 3 schedules (including no amendment).
Part I: Preliminary
Part II: Authorities
Part III: Trade of Scheduled Species
Part IV: Permit, Certificate and Registration
Part V: Power Relating to Enforcement, Seizure, Arrest, etc.
Part VI: General
Schedules

References

External links
 International Trade in Endangered Species Act 2008 

2008 in Malaysian law
Malaysian federal legislation